Tathiana Garbin and Angelique Widjaja were the defending champions, but Widjaja did not compete this year. Garbin teamed up with Caroline Schneider and lost in quarterfinals to tournament winners Petra Mandula and Patricia Wartusch.

Petra Mandula and Patricia Wartusch won the title by defeating Emmanuelle Gagliardi and Patty Schnyder 6–3, 6–2 in the final.

Seeds

Draw

Draw

References

External links
 Official results archive (ITF)
 Official results archive (WTA)

Croatian Bol Ladies Open - Women's Doubles
Croatian Bol Ladies Open
2003 in Croatian women's sport